The Raigam Tele'es Best Teledrama Director Award is presented annually in Sri Lanka by the Kingdom of Raigam to the best Sri Lankan television director of that year.

The award was first given in 2005. A list of the winners:

Award list in each year

References

Performing arts awards
Raigam Tele'es
Film awards for makeup and hairstyling
Awards established in 2005